An Evening with Lena Horne is a 1994 live album by Lena Horne.

At the 38th Grammy Awards, Horne's performance on this album won her the Grammy Award for Best Jazz Vocal Performance.

Track listing
 "I Come Runnin'" (Roc Hillman) – 3:08
 "Maybe" (Billy Strayhorn) – 2:47
 "I've Got the World on a String" (Harold Arlen, Ted Koehler) – 4:56
 "Old Friend" (Stephen Sondheim) – 3:13
 "Something to Live For" (Duke Ellington, Strayhorn) – 5:12
 "Mood Indigo" (Barney Bigard, Ellington, Irving Mills) – 1:11
 "Squeeze Me" (Fats Waller, Clarence Williams) – 1:20
 "Do Nothin' Till You Hear from Me" (Ellington, Bob Russell) – 4:21
 "Yesterday, When I Was Young" (Charles Aznavour, Herbert Kretzmer) – 5:45
 "How's Your Romance?" (Cole Porter) – 1:50
 "Why Shouldn't I?" (Porter) – 2:56
 "Ours" (Porter) – 2:50
 "Just One of Those Things" (Porter) – 3:27
 "We'll Be Together Again" (Carl Fischer, Frankie Laine) – 1:24
 "Watch What Happens" (Norman Gimbel, Michel Legrand) – 3:36
 "The Lady Is a Tramp" (Lorenz Hart, Richard Rodgers) – 3:04

Personnel

Performance
Lena Horne – vocals
Mike Renzi - synthesizer, piano, musical director
Rodney Jones - guitar
Ben Brown - double bass
Akira Tana - drums
The Count Basie Orchestra:
Clarence Banks - trombone
Bill Hughes
Mel Wanzo - trombone
Danny Turner - flute, alto saxophone
Kenny King - flute, tenor saxophone
John Williams - baritone saxophone
Doug Miller
Bob Ojeda - trumpet, flugelhorn
Michael Williams

Production
Michael Cuscuna - producer
Sherman Sneed
Larry Walsh - mastering
John Harris - engineer, remixing

References

Lena Horne live albums
1994 live albums
Albums produced by Michael Cuscuna
Blue Note Records live albums
Grammy Award for Best Jazz Vocal Album